Synergin gamma also known as AP1 subunit gamma-binding protein 1 (AP1GBP1) is a protein that in humans is encoded by the SYNRG gene.

Function 

This gene encodes a protein that interacts with the gamma subunit of AP1 clathrin-adaptor complex. The AP1 complex is located at the trans-Golgi network and associates specific proteins with clathrin-coated vesicles. This encoded protein may act to connect the AP1 complex to other proteins. Alternatively spliced transcript variants that encode different isoforms have been described for this gene.

Interactions 

AP1GBP1 has been shown to interact with AP1G1 and SCAMP1.

References

Further reading 

 
 
 
 
 
 
 
 
 
 
 

EH-domain-containing proteins